The Hampton Court Conference was a meeting in January 1604, convened at Hampton Court Palace, for discussion between King James I of England and representatives of the Church of England, including leading English Puritans. The conference resulted in the 1604 Book of Common Prayer and, in 1611, the King James Version of the Bible.

Attendance

While the meeting was originally scheduled for November 1603, an outbreak of plague meant it was postponed until February. The conference was called in response to a series of requests for reform set down in the Millenary Petition by the Puritans, a document which supposedly contained the signatures of 1000 Puritan ministers, including Henry Robinson, Anthony Watson, Tobias Matthew, Thomas Dove, Anthony Rudd, Thomas Bilson, Gervase Babington, Deans Lancelot Andrewes, John Overall, James Montague, William Barlow, Giles Tomson and Thomas Ravis. Also John Rainolds (sometimes written as Reynolds), the president of Corpus Christi College, Oxford. There were three meetings over a period of five days.

The first meeting

The conference set off with a meeting between James and his bishops about some of the Puritan complaints detailed in the Millenary Petition, particularly the complaints about the Catholic terms Absolution and Confirmation. The King, after ending his talks with the bishops, claimed he was "well satisfied", and declared that "the manner might be changed and some things cleared". Private baptism, especially when administered by women, would prove to be a more intense argument between James and his bishops, but James eventually persuaded them that only ministers should administer baptisms.

James then turned his attention to ecclesiastical discipline. Excommunication for "trifles and twelvepenny matters" was to be abolished, and the often hasty trial policies of the commissaries' court were to be reviewed and amended by the Lord Chancellor and Lord Chief Justice. For the Puritan complaint that punishment should be enforced by Christ's own institution, James held the view that bishops should not exercise ecclesiastical discipline solely, though he did not speak of any specific method that he would use to remedy this.

All in all, James was pleased, and had good reason to be, with the first meeting. Not only had he eloquently reached agreements on many of the Puritan demands, he also avoided any major arguments.

The aftermath

Soon after the conference, Archbishop John Whitgift died and the anti-Puritan Richard Bancroft, who had argued against the Puritans at Hampton Court, was appointed to the See of Canterbury, and the King's fears led to demands that Puritan ministers adhere to each of the Thirty-Nine Articles.

But the Hampton Court Conference also bore fruit for the Puritans, who, led by Rainolds, insisted that man know God's word without intermediaries, as it led to James's commissioning of that translation of the Christian Bible into the English vernacular, which would be known as the Authorised Version because it alone was authorised to be read in Churches. It is now commonly described as the King James Version. Crucially, the King broadened a base of support, which under his predecessor Elizabeth I had been narrowed through harsh anti-Catholic laws, through his moderate and inclusive approach to the problems of English religion; while alienating the more extreme Puritan and Catholic elements of English Christianity.

Further reading
P. Collinson, 'The Jacobean Religious Settlement: The Hampton Court Conference' in H. Tomlinson ed., Before the English Civil War (1983)

See also
 Gunpowder Plot
 Savoy Conference

1604 in England
Puritanism in England
Hampton Court Palace
History of Christianity in the United Kingdom
History of the London Borough of Richmond upon Thames
History of the Church of England
James VI and I
King James Version
Social history of London
Stuart England
1604 in Christianity
Christian conferences